John McCrostie is an American politician who served as a member of the Idaho House of Representatives for the 16A district. McCrostie is also the assistant minority leader of the House. McCrostie is running for Garden City, Idaho city council seat in November 2021.

Early life and education
McCrostie grew up in Mountain Home, Idaho, and graduated from Mountain Home High School in 1988. He graduated magna cum laude with a Bachelor of Arts in music education from Oral Roberts University.

Career 
McCrostie taught music in Mountain Home, and later started working for Hewlett-Packard (HP) and providing title insurance. He also rose in the ranks of organized labor for the National Education Association and advocated for LGBT workers in the education sector and at HP.

Elections

2014 
In 2013, McCrostie announced his run in the Democratic primary for State House District 16A to succeed Grant Burgoyne, who ran for the district's open senate seat.

McCrostie won the May 2014 Democratic primary against former NFL player Jimmy Farris and Jeff Stephenson with 52.6% of the vote. McCrostie defeated Republican nominee Rosann Wiltse with 58.4% of the vote in the general election.

2016 
McCrostie defeated Geoff Stephenson in the Democratic primary with 83.7% of the vote. McCrostie defeated Republican nominee Joel H. Robinson with 53.8% of the vote in the general election.

2018 
McCrostie ran unopposed in the Democratic primary. McCrostie defeated Republican nominee and local Irrigation District Director Graham Paterson with 61.9% of the vote.

2020 
McCrostie ran unopposed in the Democratic primary. McCrostie defeated Independent candidate (but affiliated with the Republican Party) Chandler S Hadrabet with 98.1% of the vote.

2021 
McCrostie is running for one of two seats on Garden City, Idaho city council. McCrosite is running has apart of slate with Hannah Ball running for mayor and Greta Mohr for the other seat on city council.

Personal life
McCrostie is the second openly-LGBT member in the history of the Idaho, after Nicole LeFavour, to have served in the Idaho Legislature from 2004 to 2012.

References

External links
John McCrostie at the Idaho Legislature
Campaign site
Campaign site

LGBT state legislators in Idaho
Schoolteachers from Idaho
Democratic Party members of the Idaho House of Representatives
Gay politicians
People from Ada County, Idaho
People from Mountain Home, Idaho
American music educators
Year of birth missing (living people)
Living people
Oral Roberts University alumni
21st-century American politicians